Ananda Shake are a psychedelic trance duo. It is composed of Osher Swissa and Lior Edri, both from the city Qiryat Gat, located southern Israel.

The act is considered one of the most influential in the full-on subgenre of psy-trance. So far, they have produced 4 albums and a large number of works for compilation releases, including remixes for other artists.

Like the other popular psytrance bands on the scene, they regularly perform at concerts in countries all over the world.

Discography

References

External links
 Band profile at MySpace
 Ananda Shake on Discogs

Israeli psychedelic trance musicians
Israeli electronic music groups
Israeli musical duos